is a Japanese professional footballer who plays as a goalkeeper for Tokyo Verdy.

References

External links

1996 births
Living people
Japanese footballers
Association football goalkeepers
Azul Claro Numazu players
J3 League players